Dennis DeBar, Jr. (born October 25, 1971) is an American politician who has served in the Mississippi State Senate from the 43rd district since 2016. He previously served in the Mississippi House of Representatives from the 105th district from 2012 to 2016.

References

1971 births
Living people
Republican Party members of the Mississippi House of Representatives
Republican Party Mississippi state senators
21st-century American politicians